Badminton was an exhibition sport at the 1988 Summer Olympics in Seoul. There were five events: men's singles, women's singles, men's doubles, women's doubles, and mixed doubles. Competitions took place at the Seoul National University Gymnasium on 19 September 1988.

Qualification
The competitors were selected according to the results of the 1987 IBF World Championships.

Medallists

Medal table

Participating nations

References
http://www.la84foundation.org/6oic/OfficialReports/1988/1988v1p2.pdf
Official Olympic Report

1988 Summer Olympics events
1988
Badminton tournaments in South Korea
1988 in badminton
Men's events at the 1988 Summer Olympics
Women's events at the 1988 Summer Olympics